This is a list of political offices which have been held by a lesbian, gay, bisexual or transgender person, with details of the first such holder of each office. It should only list people who came out as LGBT before or during their terms in office; it should not list people who came out only after retiring from politics, or people who were outed by reference sources only after their death.

The year in brackets refers to the year which the officeholder was elected as an openly LGBT person. If they came out during term of office it is referred to after the year in brackets.

It is ordered by country, by dates of appointment. Former countries are also to be listed.

Heads of state

Heads of government

International bodies

European Union

European Commission
European Commissioner for Trade – Peter Mandelson – 2004 (British)

European Parliament 
Arranged by country

Austria – Ulrike Lunacek – 2009
Denmark – Torben Lund – 1999
Belgium – Petra De Sutter – 2019
Finland – Silvia Modig – 2019
France – Roger Karoutchi – 1997 [Came out as gay in 2009]
Germany – Lissy Gröner – 1989
Ireland – Maria Walsh – 2019
Italy – Gianni Vattimo – 1999
Netherlands – Herman Verbeek (PPR) – 1984
Poland – Robert Biedroń (Spring) – 2019
Portugal – Paulo Rangel (PSD) – 2009 [Came out: 2021]
Spain – José María Mendiluce Pereiro (PSOE; later joining the Greens) – 1999–2004 [Came out: 2003]
Spain – Antoni Comín (Junts) – 2019
Sweden – Fredrick Federley and Malin Björk – 2014
United Kingdom – Tom Spencer – 1999 [Came out: 1999]
United Kingdom – Nikki Sinclaire – 2009 [Came out as lesbian in 2004; Came out as transgender in 2013]

Regional leaders

Americas

Aruba
 Parliament of Aruba (Senator) – Miguel Mansur – 2021 [First openly gay party leader]

Argentina
 Senate – Osvaldo López – 2011 [First openly gay man]
Chamber of Deputies –  – 2001 [First openly lesbian woman]
Chamber of Deputies – Leonardo Grosso – 2011 [First openly gay man; Came out: 2018]
Government Minister (Ministry of Foreign Affairs and Worship) – Jorge Faurie – 2017 [First openly gay man]
Government Minister (Ministry of Women, Genders and Diversity – Ayelén Mazzina – 2022 [First openly lesbian woman]
Government Secretary (Undersecretary of Diversity Policies) – Alba Rueda – 2019 [First openly transgender person]
Government Member (Office for the Coordination of Diversity and Non-Discrimination of the Ministry of Security) – Mara Pérez Reynoso – 2015 [First openly transgender person]
Provincial governor (Tierra del Fuego) – Gustavo Melella – 2019 [First openly gay man]
Buenos Aires City Legislature – María Rachid – 2011 [First openly lesbian woman]
Buenos Aires City Legislature – Maximiliano Ferraro – 2011 [First openly gay man]
Mayor (General Pinto, Buenos Aires) – Alexis Guerrera – 2003 [First openly gay man]
Mayor (Loncopué, Neuquén) – María Fernanda Villone – 2011 [First openly lesbian woman]

Bolivia
 Congressperson (Deputy) – Manuel Canelas – 2015 [First openly gay male]
 Assemblyperson (La Paz) – París Galán – 2015 [First openly transgender male]

Brazil
Alderperson (Colônia do Piauí) – Kátia Tapety – 1992 [First transgender woman elected]
Vice-mayor – Kátia Tapety – 2004 [First transgender woman]
Congressperson (Federal Deputy) – Clodovil Hernandes – 2006 [First openly gay male]
Alderperson (Salvador) – Leo Kret – 2008 [First transgender woman elected]
First mayor elected (Lins, São Paulo) – Edgar de Souza – 2012
Mayor (Itapecerica, Minas Gerais) – Wirley Rodrigues Reis – 2016
Alderperson (Rio de Janeiro) – Marielle Franco (2017) and David Miranda (2019) [First openly bisexual female and first openly gay male respectively]
Alderperson (São Paulo) – Fernando Holiday – 2016
Senator (Espírito Santo) – Fabiano Contarato – 2018
Assemblyperson (State Deputy of São Paulo) – Erica Malunguinho – 2018 [First transgender woman congressperson]
 Congressperson (Federal Deputy) – David Miranda – 2019
 Governor (Rio Grande do Sul) – Eduardo Leite – 2021
 Governor (Rio Grande do Norte) – Fátima Bezerra - 2021

Canada

Chile
 Councilmember – Alejandra González Pino – 2004 [First elected transgender woman]
 Councilmember – Jaime Parada – 2012 [First openly gay male]
 Chamber of Deputies – Claudio Arriagada – 2013 [First openly gay male]
Chamber of Deputies – Guillermo Ceroni – 2013
Chamber of Deputies – Emilia Schneider – 2021 [First openly transgender person]
Chamber of Deputies – Marcela Riquelme – 2021 [First openly lesbian female (2021)]
Chamber of Deputies – Francisca Bello, Camila Musante – 2021 [First openly bisexual female (2021)]

Colombia
 Minister of Transport – Cecilia Álvarez-Correa Glen −2012–2014 [Came out: 2014]
 Minister of Education – Gina Parody – 2014–2018
Minister of Trade and Industry – Cecilia Álvarez-Correa Glen – 2014–2018
 Minister of Environment and Sustainable Development – Ricardo Lozano Picón – 2018
 Senate – Claudia López – 2015
 House of Representatives – Angélica Lozano Correa – 2014
 National Agency (Director of the Alexander von Humboldt Institute for Biodiversity) – Brigitte Baptiste [First transgender woman]
 Mayor of Bogota – Claudia López – 2019
 Minister of Justice – Néstor Osuna – 2022

Costa Rica
 Legislative Assembly – Carmen Muñoz – elected 2010 and minister appointed in 2014 [first openly lesbian person]
 Cabinet Minister – Wilhelm von Breymann Barquero – appointed in 2014. [first openly gay man]
 Legislative Assembly – Enrique Sánchez – 2018 [first openly gay male]

Cuba
Municipal council – Adela Hernandez– 2012 [First transgender person elected to office]

Ecuador
 National Assembly – Sandra Alvarez – 2009, first openly LGBT substitute lawmaker.
 Minister of Health: Carina Vance Mafla – 2012
 National Assembly – Diane Marie Rodríguez Zambrano – 2017 [First transgender woman substitute lawmaker]
 Mayor of Pujilí - José Arroyo Cabrera - 2023, first openly LGBT mayor in Ecuador.

El Salvador
 Mayor (Intipucá) – Hugo Salinas – 2009

Guatemala
 Member of Congress – Sandra Morán – 2016 [First lesbian female congressperson]
 Member of Congress – Aldo Dávila – 2020[First gay male congressperson]
Member of Central American Parliament – José Carlos Hernández Ruano –2020[First Guatemalan gay male parliamentarian]

Mexico
Federal Deputy – Patria Jiménez – 1997 [First openly lesbian female]
Federal Deputy – David Sánchez Camacho – 2006 [First openly gay male]
Federal Deputy – María Clemente García – 2021 [One of the first two transgender women]
Federal Deputy – Salma Luévano – 2021 [One of the first two transgender women]
Local Deputy (Federal District) – Enoé Uranga – 2000 [First openly lesbian female]
Local Deputy (Federal District) – David Sánchez Camacho – 1997 [First openly gay male]
Municipal president (Fresnillo, Zacatecas) – Benjamín Medrano Quezada – 2013 [First openly gay male]
City Council (Guanajuato, Guanajuato) – Rubí Suárez Araujo – 2016 [first transgender city councillor]
City Council (Durango City, Durango) – Ezequiel García Torres – 2017 [First openly gay male]

Peru
 Councilmember – Luisa Revilla – 2014 [First transgender woman]
 Member of Congress – Carlos Bruce – 2006; 2016–2021 [First openly gay male congressman; Came out: 2014]
Member of Congress – Alberto de Belaunde (Ungrouped) – 2016
Minister of Transport and Communications – Carlos Bruce – September 2017

Puerto Rico 

Chief Justice of the Supreme Court of Puerto Rico – Maite Oronoz Rodríguez – 15 July 2014

Trinidad and Tobago 
Parliament of Trinidad and Tobago (Senator) – Jowelle de Souza – 2022 [First transgender person]

United States

Uruguay
 Director of Macro Counseling in Social Policies – Andrés Scagliola – 2010 [First openly gay member of the government; Came out: 2011]
 House of Representatives (Substitute Deputy) – Martín Couto – 2014 [First openly gay congressperson; Came out: 2017]
 Member of Parliament – Michelle Suárez Bértora – 2014 [First transgender legislator]

Venezuela
 National Assembly (Deputy) – Tamara Adrián – elected 2015 [First transgender woman]
National Assembly (Deputy)- Rosmit Mantilla – elected 2015 [First openly gay male]

Europe

Austria

Member of Parliament – Ulrike Lunacek – 1999 [First openly lesbian Member of Parliament]
Member of Parliament – Mario Lindner – 2017 [First openly gay Member of Parliament]
Minister – Iris Eliisa Rauskala – 2019 [First openly LGBT minister, openly lesbian, Minister of Education]
 Mayor – Georg Djundja – 2019 [First openly LGBT mayor, openly gay, mayor of Oberndorf bei Salzburg]

Belgium

Prime Minister – Elio Di Rupo (PS) – 2011 [First openly gay male to head a Belgian national government in modern times]
Member of the Federal Government (Federal Minister of Civil Service) – Petra De Sutter (Groen) – 2020 [First openly trans national minister in Europe]
Member of the Flemish Government (Flemish Minister of Education) – Pascal Smet (SP.A) – 2009–2014 [Came out; 2009]
Member of the Brussels Government (Minister of Mobility and Public Works) – Pascal Smet (SP.A) – 2004–2009
Member of the Brussels Government –  (Groen) – 2012

Croatia

Member of Parliament – Domagoj Hajduković – 2011 [First openly gay male]

Czech Republic
Member of the Senate – Václav Fischer – 1999–2002 [First openly gay male]
Minister of Transport – Gustáv Slamečka – 2009–2010 
Minister for Regional Development – Karla Šlechtová – 2014 [First openly lesbian female]
Regional council member (Prague) – Matěj Stropnický – 2014
Party leader (Green Party) – Matěj Stropnický – 2016–2017

Denmark

Member of Parliament – Yvonne Herløv Andersen – 1998 [She was an MP for a few terms during the 1970s and 1980s, but not while openly lesbian.]
Member of Parliament – Torben Lund – 1998 [First openly gay male; Came out: February 1998]
Minister of Culture – Uffe Elbæk – 2011–2012
Member of Parliament (Alternative in Sjællands Storkreds) – Rasmus Nordqvist – 2015
Minister of Justice – Søren Pape Poulsen – 2016
Minister for Science, Technology, Information and Higher Education – Tommy Ahlers – 2018 [Came out (bisexual): July 2018]

Faroe Islands

Member of Parliament - Sonja J. Jógvansdóttir – 2015

Finland

Member of Parliament (Finnish Parliament) – Oras Tynkkynen – 2004
Leader of a major political party (Green League) – Pekka Haavisto – 1992
Minister of the Environment – Pekka Haavisto – 1995
Member of Parliament (Finnish Parliament) – Merikukka Forsius – 1999 [First bisexual female]
Member of Parliament (Finnish Parliament) – Reijo Paananen – 2002
Secretary of a major political party (Social Democratic Party of Finland) – Reijo Paananen – 2012
Member of Parliament (Finnish Parliament for Pirkanmaa) – Oras Tynkkynen – 2004
Member of Parliament (Finnish Parliament for Uusimaa) – Jani Toivola – 2011 
Member of Parliament (Finnish Parliament) – Silvia Modig – 2011 [First lesbian female]
Minister for International Development – Pekka Haavisto – 2013
Minister for Foreign Affairs – Pekka Haavisto – 2019

France

Member of Parliament (Minister in charge of relations) – André Labarrère(fr) – 1981 [Came out: 1998]
Mayor of Paris: – Bertrand Delanoë – 2001  [Came out: 1998]
Government Member (Ministry of Culture) – Jean-Jacques Aillagon – 2002 (came out in 2002).
Government Member (Secretary of State for relations with parliament ) – Roger Karoutchi – 2007 [Came out: 2009]
Member of Parliament (National Assembly of France) – Franck Riester – 2007 [Came out: 2011]
Member of Parliament (National Assembly of France, Allier) – Laurence Vanceunebrock-Mialon – 2017
Government Member (Secretary of State for the Digital Sector) – Mounir Mahjoubi – 2017 (came out in 2018).
Government Member (Secretary of State for Youth and Education) – Gabriel Attal – 2018 (came out in 2018).

Germany

Reich Minister without portfolio, Reichsleiter: Ernst Röhm (NSDAP) — 1933–1934 (outed in 1931). Historian Laurie Marhoefer writes that Röhm became the world's "first openly gay politician" after letters in which he called himself "same-sex orientated [gleichgeschlechtlich]" were published by Social Democratic newspapers.
Member of Parliament – Helga Schuchardt (FDP) – 1972–1983 [Outed: 1992 (while serving as Minister of Science and Culture in Lower Saxony at that time]
Member of Parliament – Herbert Rusche (Greens) – 1985–1987 
Member of Parliament (Speaker for Legal Affairs) – Volker Beck (Greens) – 1994
Member of Parliament (Bundestag) for North Rhine-Westphalia) – Barbara Hendricks (SPD) – 1994 
Member of Parliament (Bundestag) – Tessa Ganserer (Greens) & Nyke Slawik (Greens) – 2021 [First openly transgender persons]
Mayor (Hamburg) – Ole von Beust – 2001–2010 [He also served as president of Bundesrat in 2007–2008]
Mayor (Berlin) – Klaus Wowereit – 2001–2014 [He also served as president of Bundesrat in 2001–2002]
Vice Chancellor – Guido Westerwelle, leader of (FDP) – 2009–2011
Foreign Minister – Guido Westerwelle, leader of (FDP) – 2009–2013
Mayor (Bielefeld) – Pit Clausen (SPD) – 2009 
Mayor (Mainz) – Michael Ebling – 2012
Mayor (Wiesbaden) – Sven Gerich – 2013
Minister for the Environment, Nature Conservation, Building and Nuclear Safety – Barbara Hendricks (SPD) – 2013–2018
Mayor (Essen) – Thomas Kufen – 2015
Health Minister – Jens Spahn (CDU) – 2018

Greece

 Cabinet minister – Nicholas Yatromanolakis (2021)

Hungary

Member of Parliament – Klára Ungár(hu) – 1990 [First openly lesbian female]
Member of Parliament – Péter Ungár(hu) – 2018 [First openly gay male, came out: 2019]
Member of Government (Secretary of State for Human Resources) – Gábor Szetey – 2006–2009 [came out: 2007]

Iceland
Prime Minister – Jóhanna Sigurðardóttir – 2009–2013 [First openly gay person in the world to be elected head of government] 
Minister of Social Affairs and Social Security – Jóhanna Sigurðardóttir – 1987–1994, 2007–2009
Minister for the Environment and Natural Resources – Guðmundur Ingi Guðbrandsson – 2017 [First openly gay male to serve as a minister]

Ireland
Senator – David Norris (Dublin University) – 1987
Senator – Katherine Zappone (Taoiseach's nominee) – 2011
Member of the Oireachtas (parliament) – TD (Member of Dáil) – Dominic Hannigan (Meath East) – openly gay when elected in 2011
Member of the Oireachtas (parliament) – TD (Member of Dáil) – John Lyons (Dublin North-West) – openly gay when elected in 2011
Member of the Oireachtas (parliament) – TD (Member of Dáil) – Jerry Buttimer (Cork South-Central) – Elected as TD in 2011; came out in 2012
Minister for Transport, Tourism and Sport – Leo Varadkar – 2011 [came out: 2015]
Mayor (Fingal County Council) – Cian O'Callaghan – 2012
Leader of the Seanad Éireann – Jerry Buttimer – 2016
Minister for Children and Youth Affairs – Katherine Zappone – 2016 [The first minister to have been openly gay at the time of first appointment to cabinet]
Member of the Oireachtas (parliament) – TD (Member of Dáil) – Katherine Zappone (Dublin South-West) – 2016
Taoiseach (Prime Minister) – Leo Varadkar – 2017
Leader of largest party in Dáil Éireann – Leo Varadkar, Fine Gael – 2017
Member of the European Parliament – Maria Walsh, 2019

Isle of Man
Chief Minister – Allan Bell – 2011 [Came out: 2015]

Italy

Member of Parliament – Angelo Pezzana(it) – 1979 [First openly gay male]
Minister for Agriculture – Alfonso Pecoraro Scanio – 2000 [Came out (bisexual): 2000]
Member of Parliament – Titti De Simone(it) – 2001 [First lesbian]
Mayor (Gela) – Rosario Crocetta – 2003–2009 [First openly gay male mayor]
President of Apulia – Nichi Vendola – 2005–2015
Member of Parliament – Vladimir Luxuria – 2006 [First transgender woman]
Member of Parliament – Sergio Lo Giudice – 2013 [Former Arcigay president]
Member of Parliament (Vice president of the Democratic Party) – Ivan Scalfarotto – 2009 
President of Sicily – Rosario Crocetta – 2012–2017
First transgender mayor (Tromello) – Gianmarco Negri – 2019
Acting President of Calabria – Antonino Spirlì – 2020–2021
Minister for Youth Policies and Sport – Vincenzo Spadafora – 2019 [Came out (gay): 2021]

Latvia 
Member of Parliament (Minister of Foreign Affairs) – Edgars Rinkēvičs – 2014 [First openly gay male; Came out: 2014]
Member of Parliament – Marija Golubeva – 2018 [First openly lesbian female]
Chairman of a political party (The Progressives) –  – 2018 [First openly gay male]

Lithuania 
Member of Parliament: Rokas Žilinskas – 2008
Member of Parliament: Tomas Vytautas Raskevičius – 2020

Luxembourg
Mayor of Luxembourg City – Xavier Bettel – 2011
Prime Minister – Xavier Bettel – 2013
 Deputy Prime Minister – Etienne Schneider – 2013

Netherlands

Member of Parliament – Coos Huijsen (CHU) – 1972 (Came out: 1977; World's first openly gay MP)
Member of Parliament – Evelien Eshuis (CPN) – 1982
King's Commissioner – Jan Franssen (VVD) – 2000–2013
Mayor – Arno Brok (VVD) – 2003–2010
Minister of Economic Affairs – Joop Wijn (CDA) – 2006
 Minister of Agriculture, Nature and Food – Gerda Verburg (CDA) – 2007
 Minister of Finance – Jan Kees de Jager (CDA) – 2010
 Member of Parliament – Rob Jetten (D66) – 2017
 Minister of the Interior and Kingdom Relations – Kajsa Ollongren (D66) – 2017
 Member of Parliament – Vera Bergkamp (D66) – 2017
 Member of Parliament – Henk Krol (50PLUS) – 2017
 Member of Parliament – Henk Nijboer (PvdA) – 2017
 Member of Parliament – Sjoerd Potters (VVD) – 2017
 City councillor municipality Apeldoorn – Lilian Haak (VVD) – 2018 (one of the first four transgender councilors) 
 City councillor municipality Nijmegen – Michelle van Doorn (PvdD) – 2018 (one of the first four transgender councilors)
 City councillor municipality Utrecht – Sophie Schers (Groen Links) – 2018 (one of the first four transgender councilors)
 City councillor municipality Utrecht – Corine van Dun  (D66) – 2018 (one of the first four transgender councilors)
 Speaker of the House of Representatives – Vera Bergkamp (D66) – 2021

Norway
 Prime Minister (acting) – Per-Kristian Foss – 2002
Member of Parliament – Wenche Lowzow – 1977–1985, reelected 1981 [Came out 1979; First openly lesbian female]
Member of Parliament – Anders Hornslien – 1993–2001 [Came out: 2001]
City council chairman of Oslo – Erling Lae – 2000–2009
Member of Bergen city council and chairman of the Red Electoral Alliance and Red Party – Torstein Dahle – 1987–2018, 2003–2007, and 2007–2010 respectively [Came out late 1960s]
Minister of Finance – Per-Kristian Foss – 2001–2005
Minister of Health and Care Services – Bent Høie – 2013–2021

Poland
Member of Parliament – Jarosław Iwaszkiewicz – 1952–1980
City councillor – Krystian Legierski – 2010 [First openly LGBT holder of any office in Poland] 
Mayor (Słupsk) – Robert Biedroń – 2014–2018
Member of parliament – Anna Grodzka – 2011 [First openly transgender woman]
Sołtys (Bobrowniki) – Łukasz Włodarczyk – 2017–present
Deputy mayor (Warsaw) – Paweł Rabiej – 2018–present
Leader of a political party (Spring) – Robert Biedroń – 2019–present
Member of the European Parliament for Poland – Robert Biedroń – 2019–present

Portugal

Member of Parliament – Miguel Vale de Almeida – 2009–2010
Member of the government (Secretary of State Assistant and of Administrative Modernisation) – Graça Fonseca – 2015–2018 [Came out: 2017]
Member of the government (Minister of Culture) – Graça Fonseca – 2018
Party deputy leader – Adolfo Mesquita Nunes (CDS – People's Party) – 2018
Member of the government (Secretary of State of the Presidency of the Council of Ministers) – André Caldas – 2020

Serbia

Prime Minister – Ana Brnabić – 2017
Government minister (Minister of Public Administration and Local Self-Government) – Ana Brnabić – 2016–2017
Assistant Minister for International Cooperation in the Ministry of Human and Minority Rights and Social Dialogue – Boris Milićević – 2020

Slovakia

Member of Parliament – Edita Angyalová – 2002 [First openly lesbian female]
Member of Parliament – Stanislav Fořt – 2011 [First openly gay male; Came out: 2011]
Member of Bratislava city council - Lucia Plaváková - 2022 [First openly member of Bratislava city council]

Spain

Member of the Cortes (Senate) – Jerónimo Saavedra (PSOE) – 1977–2004 [Came out: 2000]
Regional President (President of the Canary Islands) Jerónimo Saavedra – 1983–1987, 1991–1993 [Came out: 2000]
Minister of Public Administrations and Minister of Education and Science- Jerónimo Saavedra (Public Administrations, 1993–1995 and of Education and Science 1995–1996)
Town councillor (Geldo, Castellon) Manuela Trasobares (ARDE) – 2007 [First transgender woman]
Mayor of a Provincial Capital (Las Palmas de Gran Canaria) – Jerónimo Saavedra – 2007–2011
Member of the Cortes (Madrid) – Ángeles Álvarez (PSOE) – 2011
Mayor of an Autonomic Capital (Vitoria-Gasteiz) – Javier Maroto (PP) – 2011–2015 [Member of Basque Parliament since 2012, Sectorial Under-secretary of the Spanish People's Party since 2015. Member of the Member of the Cortes since 2016.]
Minister of the Interior – Fernando Grande-Marlaska – 2018–present
Minister of Culture and Sport – Màxim Huerta – 2018
Minister of Territorial Policy and Civil Service – Miquel Iceta – 2021–present

Autonomous regional parliament members
Minister of Health of Catalonia – Antoni Comín i Oliveres (Together for Yes) – 2016
Minister of Culture of Catalonia – Santi Vila (Together For Yes – CDC) – c. 2017
Minister of Culture and Education of Galicia – Jesús Vázquez Abad (People's Party of Galicia) – 2007–2015
Member of the Parliament of Catalonia – Miquel Iceta PSC – 1999 [First openly gay male]
Member of the Basque Parliament – Iñaki Oyarzábal – 1996 [Secretary General of the Spanish People's Party of the Basque Country, 2008–2014. He is member of the Senate of Spain since 2016.]
Member of the Assembly of Extremadura – Víctor Casco – 2014
Member of the Assembly of Madrid – Carla Antonelli – 2011 [First transgender woman and LGBT rights activist who was instrumental in the approval of the Spanish Gender Identity Law.]
Member of the Corts Valencianes – Fran Ferri (spokesman of Coalició Compromís) – 2011

Sweden

Member of Parliament – Kent Carlsson (s) – 1991 [Came out: 1991]
Member of Parliament – Elisebeht Markström (s) – 1995 [Came out publicly: 2006]
Minister of the Environment – Andreas Carlgren – 2006
Minister of Migration Affairs – Tobias Billström – 2006 [First bisexual male]

Switzerland
Member of Parliament – Claude Janiak – 1999 [First openly gay male]
Member of Parliament – Marianne Huguenin – 2003 [Came out: 2004]
President of the National Council – Claude Janiak – 2005–2006
Speaker of House of Representatives – Claude Janiak – 2006
Cantonal Governments (Member of the Executive Council of Bern) – Bernhard Pulver – 2006 
Mayor (Zurich) – Corine Mauch – 2009 [First openly gay mayor of a large Swiss city]
Cantonal Governments (Member of the Executive Council of St. Gallen) – Martin Klöti – 2012

United Kingdom

Africa

Mauritius
Deputy Prime Minister of Mauritius – Gaëtan Duval – 1976 & 1983

South Africa
High Court Judge – Edwin Cameron – 1995
Member of Parliament – Mike Waters – 1999
Constitutional Court Justice – Edwin Cameron – 2008
Provincial Premier – Lynne Brown – 2009
Member of Parliament – Zakhele Mbhele – 2014
Cabinet minister – Lynne Brown – 2014
Municipal Councillor – Dimakatso Moloisane – 2015
Mayor – Christopher Pappas – 2021

Tunisia

Leader of a political party (Tunisian Liberal Party) – Mounir Baatour – 2011

Asia

Hong Kong
Legislative Council Member – Raymond Chan Chi-chuen – 2012 [First openly gay man]
District Council Member — Jimmy Sham, Kenneth Cheung, and Alice Wei — 2019 [First openly gay and lesbian councillors]

India
Member of the Legislative Assembly (Madhya Pradesh) – Shabnam Mausi – 1998–2003 [First transgender person to be elected to public office]
Hereditary Prince (Rajpipla, Gujarat) – Manvendra Singh Gohil – [First openly gay prince in the world]
Mayor (Raigarh, Chhattisgarh) – Madhu Bai Kinnar – 4 January 2015 [First transgender mayor of a city]

Israel
 Member of Knesset (Parliament) – Uzi Even – 2003 [First openly gay male]
Member of Knesset (Parliament) – Nitzan Horowitz (Meretz) – 2008
Member of Knesset (Parliament) – Itzik Shmuli (Israeli Labor Party) –  2013
Member of Knesset (Parliament) – Amir Ohana (Likud) – 2015
City councillor (Tel-Aviv) – Michal Eden – 1998 [First openly elected lesbian female]
City councillor (Tel-Aviv) – Itai Pinkas (2003) and Yaniv Weizman (2008) [First openly elected gay males respectively]
City councillor (Jerusalem) – Saar Netanel – 2003
Minister – Amir Ohana – 2019.
Leader of a political party (Meretz) – Nitzan Horowitz – 2019 [First openly gay male]
 Deputy mayor of Tel Aviv – Chen Arieli – 2019

Japan

 Ward councillor (Setagaya, Tokyo) – Aya Kamikawa – 2003 [First transgender woman]
 Prefectural assembly member (Osaka) – Kanako Otsuji – 2005 [First openly lesbian woman]
 Ward councillor (Tokyo) – Taiga Ishikawa (Toshima) and Wataru Ishizaka (Nakano) – 2011 [First elected gay men]
Member of the House of Councillors (Upper House) – Kanako Otsuji – 2013 [First openly lesbian woman]
City councillor (Iruma, Saitama) – Tomoya Hosoda – 2017 [First transgender man]
Member of the Diet (Lower House) – Kanako Otsuji – 2017 [First openly lesbian woman]
City councillor (Kameoka, Kyoto) – Maria Akasaka – 2019 [First transgender female]
Prefectural assembly member (Hokkaido) – Ayako Fuchigami – 2019 [First transgender woman]
Member of the House of Councillors (Upper House) – Taiga Ishikawa – 2019 [First openly gay man]

Macau

 Chairperson of a political party (New Macau Association) – Jason Chao – 2010 [First openly gay male]

Nepal
Constituent Assembly Member – Sunil Babu Pant – 2008 [First openly gay male]

Philippines
Province Mayor (Municipality of Leyte, Leyte) – Arnold James Ysidoro – 1998–2004; 2010
Province Mayor (Municipality of Palapag, Northern Samar) – Florencio "Fawa" Abobo Batula – 2013 [First transgender woman]
Province Vice Mayor  Geefre "Kalay" Alonsabe  2022present " [First openly gay man]
Board Member of 2nd District of Northern Samar Province – Florencio "Fawa" Abobo Batula – 2013–2016
City Councilor (Mandaue City) – Wenceslao Gakit – 1998–2007
Board Member of Sixth District of Cebu Province – Wenceslao Gakit – 2007–2010
City Councilor (Pasay) – Justo Justo (Panfilo C Justo) –  c. 1980s 
Barangay Capitan of Angeles IV (Tayabas, Quezon Province) – Ruvic Rea – 2001 [First transgender woman]
House of Representatives – Geraldine Roman – 2016 [First transgender woman elected to Congress]

Sri Lanka
Member of the Sri Lanka Parliament – Mangala Samaraweera – 1989 [First openly gay male]
Minister – Mangala Samaraweera – 2005 [First openly gay male]
Governor – Niluka Ekanayake – 2016 [World's first transgender female Governor]

Taiwan
Minister without Portfolio – Audrey Tang – 2016 [World's first transgender minister without portfolio]

Thailand
 MP of House of Representatives of Mueang Nan District on the Provincial Administration Organization for Nan Province – Yollada Suanyot – 2012.
 MP of House Representatives – Tanwarin Sukkhapisit – 2019. [first openly transgender]

Oceania

Australia

Guam
Lieutenant Governor – Josh Tenorio 2019
Supreme Court Justice – Benjamin Cruz – 1997  [Came out: 1995]
Chief Justice – Benjamin Cruz −1999–2001 
Member of Legislature – Benjamin Cruz – 2004

New Zealand

Member of Parliament (Parliament for Raglan / Parliament for Waipa) – Marilyn Waring (National) – 1975–1984 [Outed: 1975; Officially came out: after 1984]
Member of Parliament (Parliament for Te Atatū) – Chris Carter (Labour) – 1993–2011 [First openly gay male]
Mayor – Georgina Beyer (Labour) – 1995–1999  [World's first openly transgender mayor]
Member of Parliament – Georgina Beyer (Labour) – 1999–2007 [World's first openly transgender member of parliament]
Member of Parliament – Maryan Street (Labour) – 2005–2014 [First openly lesbian female elected to parliament]
Minister of Conservation – Chris Carter (Labour) – 2002–2007
Minister of Ethnic Affairs – Chris Carter (Labour) – 2002–2008 
Minister of Local Government – Chris Carter (Labour) – 2002–2005 
Minister for Building Issues – Chris Carter (Labour) – 2004–2005 
Minister of Education - Chris Carter (Labour) – 2007–2008
Minister Responsible for the Education Review Office – Chris Carter (Labour) – 2007–2008 
Minister of Housing and Minister of ACC – Maryan Street (Labour) – 2007–2008 
Attorney-General (New Zealand) and Minister for Treaty of Waitangi Negotiations – Chris Finlayson (National) – 2008–2017 (Male)
High Court of New Zealand – Michael Muir (High Court Judge) 2014 (Male)
Minister of Finance – Grant Robertson (Labour) – 2017 (Male)
Party leader – Damian Light (United Future) – 2017
 Deputy Prime Minister – Grant Robertson (Labour) – 2020 (Male)

See also
List of LGBT firsts by year

References